UAK can refer to either:

 Narsarsuaq Airport (IATA airport code), in Narsarsuaq, Greenland
 Ukrainian karbovanets, the national currency of Ukraine from 1991-1996